Herak is a Serbo-Croatian given name derived from Heracles, and a Serbo-Croatian surname.

Notable people with the name include:

 Milan Herak (1917-2015), Croatian geologist and paleobotanist
 Marijan Herak (* 1956), Croatian geophysicist
 Ivan Herak (* 1957), Croatian politician (HDZ)

See also
Heraka
Heraklion

Surnames